Sandwich Road is a two-lane state highway in Bourne, Massachusetts, United States, traveling from Bourne center east to Sandwich. It begins at a four-way intersection with Shore Road, County Road, and Trowbridge Road in Bourne center; Waterhouse Road and Perry Avenue (the latter the former approach to the old Bourne Bridge) also once ended there. It heads east along the south side of the Cape Cod Canal, traveling under both the Bourne Bridge and the Sagamore Bridge. A short connection, also called Sandwich Road, connects the Bourne Rotary – the south end of the Bourne Bridge – with the main road. From the area of the Sagamore Bridge, at Sagamore, east to the Sandwich town line, Sandwich Road carries Route 6A.

Sandwich Road once carried both directions of Route 3, which ended at the Bourne Rotary. Later, Route 3 was truncated to the Sagamore Rotary, and US 6 became a one-way pair at the canal – eastbound on the north side and westbound on the south side (Sandwich Road). The opposite directions were signed as US 6 Byp. Eventually both directions of US 6 were moved to the north side of the canal, and Sandwich Road became an unnumbered state highway. Despite this, a small number of US 6 shields still remain on Sandwich Road, several signs in the area still identify the road as US 6, and many residents of the area still refer to it as "Route 6."

Major intersections

References

External links

Streets in Massachusetts
Transportation in Barnstable County, Massachusetts
U.S. Route 6
Bourne, Massachusetts